The First Battle of Marengo or Battle of San Giuliano (16 May 1799) saw Republican French soldiers under General of Division Jean Victor Marie Moreau launch a reconnaissance in force against a larger force of Habsburg Austrian and Imperial Russian troops led by Field Marshal Alexander Suvorov. The French enjoyed initial success, pressing back their opponents. However, large Austrian and Russian reinforcements soon arrived, causing the French to withdraw into Alessandria. This War of the Second Coalition action occurred near the town of Spinetta Marengo, located just east of Alessandria in northwest Italy. 

A series of Austrian and Russian victories in the spring of 1799 drove the French armies from north and northeast Italy. The commander of the combined Austro-Russian armies, Suvorov massed his forces opposite the fortress city of Alessandria. After a Russian force received a costly repulse in the Battle of Bassignana, Moreau sent General of Division Claude Perrin Victor's division to discover the Austro-Russian positions. After the action, Moreau sent half of his army into Genoa while taking the other half to the west. Meanwhile, Suvorov marched his troops up the north bank of the Po River to capture Turin.

Background
The start of the 1799 campaign saw the Austrian army of Feldzeugmeister Paul Kray facing the French Army of Italy under General of Division Barthélemy Louis Joseph Schérer. The drawn Battle of Verona on 26 March was followed by the Battle of Magnano on 5 April, when Kray's 46,000 men won an important victory over 40,500 French soldiers. The demoralized Schérer left 6,600 men to the garrison of Mantua and abandoned northeast Italy. The Siege of Mantua lasted until the end of July, but other garrisons that Schérer left behind were soon forced to surrender. Counting garrisons and battle losses, the Army of Italy had only 28,000 soldiers. At this time, Suvorov arrived with 24,551 Russian soldiers and took command of the combined Austro-Russian army. 

Schérer resigned and handed over command of the army to Moreau on 26 April 1799. The next day, Suvorov attacked and won the Battle of Cassano. General of Division Jean-Mathieu-Philibert Sérurier and 2,400 men of his division were isolated and forced to surrender that evening. Moreau with General of Division Paul Grenier's division retreated west all the way to Turin, then crossed to the south bank of the Po River and marched east again. Victor's division crossed the Po at Casale Monferrato and took position near the fortress city of Alessandria. When Grenier joined Victor there on 7 May, Moreau mustered about 20,000 troops. The French were deployed between Alessandria on their right and Valenza on their left. At this time, Catherine-Dominique de Pérignon led a division from France to occupy Genoa.

On 6 May 1799, Suvorov's left wing crossed the Po at Piacenza and moved southwest toward Bobbio, threatening to cut Moreau off from Genoa. Suvorov's main body crossed the Po farther west. On 7 May, a 13,865-man Austrian corps was at Castel San Giovanni while General-major Pyotr Bagration with the 5,862-man Russian advance guard was at Voghera, both on the south bank of the Po. General Andrei Grigorevich Rosenberg with 10,571 soldiers was at Dorno with a 3,075-man advance guard at Lomello, both on the north bank. General-major Josef Philipp Vukassovich and 5,100 Austrians were farther west, also on the north bank. On 9 May, Suvorov's chief of staff, the Austrian General-major Johann Gabriel Chasteler de Courcelles and two battalions chased the French out of the town of Tortona, though its citadel held out. Wanting to mass his army on the south bank, Suvorov issued orders to Rosenberg to cross the Po at Alluvioni Cambiò, downstream from the confluence of the Po and Tanaro rivers.

Probably urged by Grand Duke Constantine Pavlovich of Russia, who had just arrived at the front and was anxious to fight, Rosenberg ignored Suvorov's instructions and crossed upstream of the point where the Tanaro flowed into the Po. The result was that Rosenberg's advance guard ran into strong resistance from Grenier's division. In the Battle of Bassignana on 12 May 1799, Moreau gave the Russians a drubbing and forced them to retreat to the north bank of the Po. Though Suvorov was fully aware of Constantine's culpability, the official responsibility for the fiasco was placed on Rosenberg's shoulders.

During this time, the Army of Naples under General of Division Jacques MacDonald was moving north from southern Italy and entering the calculations of both Moreau and Suvorov. On 10 May 1799, MacDonald reached Rome where he left 2,568 of his least fit men under the command of General of Division Gabriel Venance Rey. On 26 May, the Army of Naples reached Florence where it met troops under General of Division Paul Louis Gaultier de Kervéguen. The French troops moved through an area where the local people were in rebellion, such that one column of 3,000 French lost 600 men as casualties. Altogether, MacDonald wielded a field army of 36,728 troops in the infantry divisions of Generals of Division Jean-Baptiste Olivier, Jean-Baptiste Dominique Rusca, and Joseph Hélie Désiré Perruquet de Montrichard, and Generals of Brigade François Watrin, Jan Henryk Dąbrowski, and Jean-Baptiste Salme. This array would soon be joined by Victor.

Battle

As early as 10 May, the Cossack regiments of Denisov, Grekov, and Molchanov, supported by the Kalemin Grenadier Battalion, cleared the French from Marengo. The Austrians were massed east of the village of San Giuliano while Bagration's Russian vanguard was at Novi Ligure. Starting on 13 May, Suvorov began edging his south bank forces toward the north because he intended to cross the Po and march west toward Turin. He wanted his troops to begin crossing the Po at Alluvioni Cambiò on 16 May, but other events intervened. Earlier, Moreau believed that Suvorov was going to march against MacDonald, but now he thought that the Russian was not going south after all. From 13–15 May, the French commander concentrated his army behind the Bormida River, throwing a bridge of boats across the stream. On 16 May, Moreau sent Victor on a strong reconnaissance east toward Tortona. 

The French crossed the Bormida at a point called The Cedars. At 8:00 am they split into two columns with General of Brigade Luigi Leonardo Colli-Ricci on the left and General of Brigade Gaspard Amédée Gardanne on the right. The 74th Line Infantry acted as an advance guard. Colonel Louis Gareau with two battalions guarded the Bormida bridge. The French cavalry crossed the river upstream. Altogether the French employed 7,500 troops in the operation. General-major Adrian Karpovich Denisov, commanding the Cossack screen captured a French officer and learned that the enemy incursion was substantial. He sent appeals for help to Bagration. The 74th Line quickly brushed aside the Cossacks and drove the Allied outposts from Marengo, Spinetta, and Cascina Grossa. The outposts were manned by General-major Andreas Karaczay's Advanced Guard, but these troops did not otherwise participate in the ensuing action.

General-major Franz Joseph, Marquis de Lusignan, acting division commander in the absence of Michael von Fröhlich, deployed seven battalions and six squadrons of the Lobkowitz Dragoon Regiment Nr. 10. As the two sides advanced toward each other, the French sang the Marseillaise while the Austrian military bands played. Lusignan placed the Weber and Pertussy Grenadier Battalions on the right and the Stuart Infantry Regiment Nr. 18 and Morzin Grenadier Battalion on the left. In second line were the Paar and Schiaffinati Grenadier Battalions. A skirmish line was formed by taking ten soldiers from each company in the front line. Two squadrons of the Lobkowitz Dragoons and some artillery were posted on each flank, with more dragoons in reserve.

Denisov reported that the French troops maintained a rolling fire by platoons. He claimed that Bagration's troops hung back in a wood and that neither the Cossacks nor the Austrian dragoons were willing to charge the French infantry. This caused the Austrians to bear the brunt of the combat and they were hustled to the rear by the French. Another account stated that Bagration's troops helped repulse the initial attack, but around noon the Allies began to retreat. Finally, Feldmarschall-Leutnant Konrad Valentin von Kaim's 4,800-man Austrian division came up on the left flank. The Cossacks claimed to have wiped out a squadron of the French 1st Hussars, taking 78 prisoners. 

At about 4:00 pm, Moreau realized he was heavily outnumbered and issued the order to retreat. The French carried out their withdrawal in good order. They defended Marengo very stoutly, using the manor house and the streams in the vicinity. The French relinquished Marengo at 5:00 pm, crossed the Bormida, and dismantled their bridge by 6:30 pm. Suvorov appeared and demanded to know why the French were being allowed to escape. By this time, the French had reached a position where it was impossible to cut them off. In another account, Suvorov got to the battlefield earlier and tried to rally the Austrians, who were retreating at that time.

Result

Historian Christopher Duffy stated that Allied casualties were between 480 and 710, while French losses were between 500 and 1,500. A second source asserted that the Allies lost 43 dead, 404 wounded, and 273 missing for a total of 720. The French lost 569 dead and wounded. Digby Smith gave Austrian losses as 97 killed and 250 wounded, and Russian losses as 27 killed and 80 wounded. These figures give a total Allied loss of 124 killed and 330 wounded, or 454 casualties, while French losses are estimated at 500 casualties. On the French side 8,000 troops were engaged, while there were 9,000 Austrians and 7,500 Russians involved in the action. Smith wrote that a French battalion was cut off near the river and that many soldiers drowned. Other sources do not mention this incident.

Moreau's reconnaissance-in-force failed to reveal his opponent's intentions through unlucky timing. If the French army commander attacked the following day, Suvorov would have been gone. The 16 May battle convinced Moreau to abandon the Italian plain and get his army to the south side of the Ligurian Alps. Assuming that Suvorov intended to remain where he was, Moreau sent Victor with 7,000 infantry, 200 cavalry, but no artillery on a march to join Pérignon in Genoa. Since Piedmont was in revolt against French occupation, Victor's troops had to fight their way through the insurgents, arriving in Genoa on 22 May. Another 2,000-man column under Louis Lemoine moved from Gavi to Genoa.

With Grenier's division, most of the cavalry, and all of the artillery, Moreau tried to get through the mountains but was prevented by the insurgents. Instead he moved west to Asti on 18 May 1799 and then circled south of Turin. He ensured that a convoy from Rivoli and Pinerolo made it across the Mont Cenis Pass. However, he failed to secure a mass of artillery in the Turin arsenal. With about 10,000 men, Moreau marched south to Cherasco and Cuneo. Turning east to Mondovì, the French found that the rebels had captured Ceva. With Emmanuel Grouchy commanding a flank guard, the French column wended its way through the mountains to Loano on 6 June, from which they shipped their artillery to Genoa. Grenier's troops reached Genoa around 12 June. Historian Ramsay Weston Phipps compared this circuitous march to the movements of "a frightened hen".

Suvorov's army crossed to the north bank of the Po and was in Chivasso by 25 May 1799. The Allied army drove the French from Turin into the citadel on 27 May and seized a large number of heavy cannons in the arsenal. These weapons would soon help the Austrians reduce the French garrisons of Alessandria, Tortona and other places. Heinrich von Bellegarde's Austrian corps marched from Switzerland to the area of Alessandria, replacing Suvorov's troops.

Forces

French order of battle

Austro-Russian order of battle

Notes

References

Conflicts in 1799
Battles of the French Revolutionary Wars
Battles of the War of the Second Coalition
Battles involving France
Battles involving Russia
Battles involving Austria
1799 in Italy